Diego Bortoluzzi (born 23 September 1966) is an Italian professional football coach, most recently in charge as head coach of Palermo in Serie A.

Playing career
Coming from the renowned youth system of Atalanta, Bortoluzzi made his senior debut in the Serie A league on 17 March 1985, in a game against Napoli. He was successively loaned out to Piacenza (Serie B) and L.R. Vicenza (Serie C1) before leaving Atalanta for good to join rivals Brescia. After a single season back at Serie C1 level with Pro Sesto, he joined Venezia in 1991, playing five full Serie B seasons with the club. He then remarkably played five seasons at Treviso as key player and also team captain, before retiring in 2003 after a short stint with amateurs Conegliano.

Coaching career
In January 2004, Francesco Guidolin appointed Bortoluzzi as his assistant coach at Palermo, with whom he oversaw a historic promotion to Serie A over 30 years after the Rosanero's last top flight appearance.

He left Palermo on the summer of 2005, following Guidolin's departure, to become youth coach of his former playing club Treviso, who were just promoted to the top flight for their very first time. He was successively appointed new head coach in February 2006, following Alberto Cavasin's dismissal and with just 14 points in the league, failing to save the team from relegation. Despite that, he was confirmed for the following Serie B season, only to be fired on 5 November after managing to achieve only ten points in the first ten league games.

In November 2007, he returned to Palermo to work alongside Guidolin, then following him to work as his assistant at Parma and Udinese. He then served as Andrea Mandorlini's assistant at Verona from July to November 2015, and then again as Guidolin's assistant at Swansea from January to October 2016.

On 11 April 2017, he was named as the fifth head coach of the season of Palermo (after Davide Ballardini, Roberto De Zerbi, Eugenio Corini and Luis Diego López) for the remainder of the season, with Palermo having just achieved 15 points in 31 games (out of 38) and deep in relegation trouble. Among all things, the club's new chairman Paul Baccaglini explicitly stated his appointment was suggested by Francesco Guidolin. Despite an improvement in results, Bortoluzzi did not manage to save the team from relegation to Serie B and he was thus not confirmed for the new season.

References

1966 births
Living people
Italian footballers
Association football midfielders
Italian football managers
Serie A players
Serie A managers
Atalanta B.C. players
Piacenza Calcio 1919 players
L.R. Vicenza players
Brescia Calcio players
Venezia F.C. players
U.S. Avellino 1912 players
Treviso F.B.C. 1993 players
Treviso F.B.C. 1993 managers
Palermo F.C. managers
Swansea City A.F.C. non-playing staff